Im Yun-ji (born 12 March 1981) is a South Korean diver. She competed in the women's 10 metre platform event at the 1996 Summer Olympics.

References

External links
 

1981 births
Living people
South Korean female divers
Olympic divers of South Korea
Divers at the 1996 Summer Olympics
Place of birth missing (living people)
20th-century South Korean women
21st-century South Korean women